This is a list of episodes of the eighth season of The Ellen DeGeneres Show, which aired from September 2010 to June 2011.

Episodes

References

External links
 

8
2010 American television seasons
2011 American television seasons